Robert or Bob Ulrich may refer to:

 Bob Ulrich (Robert J. Ulrich, born 1944), former chief executive officer and chairman of Target Corporation
 Robert J. Ulrich (casting director), American casting director and producer

See also
Robert Urich, actor